Pine Valley may refer to:

Communities 
In Canada:
Pine Valley, Ontario

In the United States:
Pine Valley, California
Pine Valley, Indiana
Pine Valley, New Jersey
Pine Valley, New York
Pine Valley, Houston, Texas, a neighborhood
Pine Valley, Washington County, Utah, community in Washington County, south of the Escalante Desert
Pine Valley, Wisconsin

Fictional communities 
Pine Valley (All My Children), fictional suburb of Philadelphia
Pine Valley, Washington, fictional town in the game World in Conflict

Geographic locations
 Pine Valley (Missouri), a valley in Reynolds County, Missouri
 Pine Valley (Beaver, Millard, and Iron counties, Utah), a valley in Beaver, Millard, and Iron counties in Utah, north of the Escalante Desert
Pine Valley (Provo River), a valley in Summit and Wasatch counties, in Utah
 Pine Valley Mountains, a mountain range in Washington and Iron counties in southwestern Utah
 Pine Valley Mountain Wilderness, a designated wilderness area in northern Washington County, Utah

Other uses 
Pine Valley Cosmonauts, music ensemble from Chicago
Pine Valley Golf Club, in Pine Valley, New Jersey

See also 
Kedrovaya Pad Nature Reserve, Russia; name means Korean Pine Valley